The Rugby League Conference (RLC), also known as the Co-operative Rugby League Conference as a result of sponsorship from the Co-operative Group, is a series of regionally based divisions of amateur rugby league teams spread throughout England, Scotland, and Wales.

It was founded in 1997 as the Southern Conference League with two Divisions: East and Central. Over time, it expanded and added more and more divisions. It was replaced in 2012 with a series of regional leagues.

The trophies

The Harry Jepson Trophy was competed for by all the Conference sides until 2005 and the advent of Premier Divisions. Until 2004 it was possible for a team to finish runners-up in their division, qualify for the play-offs and still win the Harry Jepson trophy, hence some champions did not pick up a regional title in the same year. From 2005, the Harry Jepson trophy was solely for the winners of the RLC Premier divisions. Conference sides that remained in the regional divisions competed for a new trophy - the RLC Regional. The Harry Jepson trophy is still contested by teams from RLC successor leagues.

The RLC Challenge was a knock-out competition designed to give clubs meaningful pre-season games.

The RLC Shield was an optional secondary competition for RLC Regional sides not making their divisions' play-offs. It was first contested in 2002 and continued until 2005.

National League Three was absorbed into the Rugby League Conference as the Rugby League Conference National Division in 2007.

The Welsh Shield was a secondary Welsh competition for teams which did not make the play-offs for the Welsh Division. It was played for in 2004 and 2005. The Welsh premier division was split into two divisions: East and West in 2006, though this was reversed for the following season. A play-off determined the overall Welsh champion.

1997

 Harry Jepson Trophy: North London Skolars (now London Skolars)
 Central Division: Leicester Phoenix
 Eastern Division: North London Skolars (now London Skolars)

1998

 Harry Jepson Trophy: Crawley Jets
 Western Division: Chester Wolves (now Lymm RL)
 Eastern Division: South Norfolk Saints (now Bury Titans)
 Southern Division: Crawley Jets

1999

 Harry Jepson Trophy: Chester Wolves (now Lymm RL)
 Northern Division: Chester Wolves (now Lymm RL)
 Western Division: Cheltenham Warriors (now Gloucestershire Warriors)
 Eastern Division: Ipswich Rhinos (now Eastern Rhinos) 
 Southern Division: Crawley Jets

2000

 Harry Jepson Trophy: Crawley Jets
 Northern Division: Manchester Knights 
 Western Division: Birmingham Bulldogs 
 Eastern Division: Hemel Stags
 Southern Division: North London Skolars (now London Skolars)

2001

 Harry Jepson Trophy: Teesside Steelers
 North East Division: Teesside Steelers
 Northern Division: Rotherham Giants
 Midlands Division: Coventry Bears
 South Central Division: Hemel Stags
 Eastern Division: Ipswich Rhinos (now Eastern Rhinos) 
 London & South Division: Crawley Jets

2002

 Harry Jepson Trophy: Coventry Bears 
 RLC Shield: South London Storm
 North East Division: Teesside Steelers
 Northern Division: Manchester Knights
 Midlands Division: Coventry Bears 
 South Central Division: Hemel Stags
 Eastern Division: Luton Vipers
 London & South Division: North London Skolars (now London Skolars)

2003

 Harry Jepson Trophy: Bridgend Blue Bulls
 RLC Shield: Bolton Le Moors (now East Lancashire Lions)
 North East Division: Leeds Akademiks (now Leeds Akkies)
 North West Division: Carlisle Centurions (now East Cumbria Crusaders)
 North Midlands Division: Nottingham Outlaws
 Midlands Division: Birmingham Bulldogs
 South West Division: Cardiff Demons
 Welsh Division: Bridgend Blue Bulls
 Eastern Division: South Norfolk Saints (now Bury Titans)
 London & South Division: Crawley Jets

2004

 Harry Jepson Trophy: Widnes Saints
 RLC Shield: Cardiff Demons  
 RLC Challenge Cup: North London Skolars 'A' (now London Skolars)
 North East Division: Newcastle Knights (now Newcastle Storm)
 Yorkshire Division: Leeds Akademiks (now Leeds Akkies)
 Cumbrian Division: Penrith Pumas
 North West Division: Widnes Saints
 North Midlands Division: Nottingham Outlaws
 South Midlands Division: Leicester Phoenix
 Western Division: Somerset Vikings
 Welsh Division: Bridgend Blue Bulls
 Welsh Shield: Cardiff Demons
 Eastern Division: Ipswich Rhinos (now Eastern Rhinos)
 South Division: West London Sharks

2005

 Harry Jepson Trophy: Bridgend Blue Bulls
 RLC Regional: Wetherby Bulldogs
 RLC Shield: Blackpool Sea Eagles
 North Premier: West Cumbria Crusaders
 Central Premier: Leeds Akkies
 South Premier: South London Storm
 Welsh Premier: Bridgend Blue Bulls
 Welsh Shield: Newport Titans (now Titans RLFC)
 North East Division: Durham Tigers
 Yorkshire Division: Wetherby Bulldogs
 North West Division: Rochdale Spotland Rangers 
 North Midlands Division: Thorne Moor Marauders (now Moorends & Thorne Marauders)
 West Midlands Division: Wolverhampton Wizards (now Wolverhampton RLFC)
 South West Division: Gloucestershire Warriors
 Eastern Division: St Albans Centurions 'A' 
 London & South Division: Kingston Warriors (now Elmbridge)

2006

 Harry Jepson Trophy: South London Storm
 RLC Regional: Liverpool Buccaneers
 North Premier: East Lancashire Lions
 Midlands Premier: Nottingham Outlaws
 South Premier: South London Storm
 Welsh Premier: Bridgend Blue Bulls
 Welsh Premier (East): Cardiff Demons
 Welsh Premier (West): Bridgend Blue Bulls
 North Division: Carlisle Centurions (now East Cumbria Crusaders)
 Yorkshire Division: Bridlington Bulls
 Cheshire Division: Liverpool Buccaneers
 North Midlands & South Yorkshire Division: Moorends-Thorne Marauders
 West Midlands and South West Division: Gloucestershire Warriors
 Eastern Division: Bedford Tigers
 South East Division: Broadstairs Bulldogs

2007

 Rugby League Conference National: Featherstone Lions
 Harry Jepson Trophy: St Albans Centurions
 RLC Regional: Widnes Saints
 North Premier: Carlisle Centurions (now East Cumbria Crusaders)
 Midlands Premier: Coventry Bears
 South Premier: St Albans Centurions
 Welsh Premier: Bridgend Blue Bulls
 Yorkshire & Lincolnshire Division: Rossington Sharks
 North West Division: Widnes Saints
 Cheshire Division: Macclesfield Titans
 West Midlands Division: Bristol Sonics
 South West Division: Plymouth Titans
 Eastern Division: Bedford Tigers
 South Division: Farnborough Falcons
 Scottish Division: Edinburgh Eagles

2008

 Rugby League Conference National: Crusaders Colts
 Harry Jepson Trophy: Nottingham Outlaws
 RLC Regional: Moorends-Thorne Marauders
 North Premier: Carlisle Centurions (now East Cumbria Crusaders)
 Midlands Premier: Nottingham Outlaws
 South Premier: West London Sharks 
 Welsh Premier: Valley Cougars
 Yorkshire Division: Bridlington Bulls
 South Yorkshire & Lincolnshire Division: Moorends-Thorne Marauders
 North West Division: Widnes Saints
 Cheshire Division: Northwich Stags
 West Midlands Division: Bristol Sonics
 South West Division: East Devon Eagles
 Eastern Division: Hainault Bulldogs
 Scottish Division: Edinburgh Eagles
 Scottish Shield: Carluke Tigers
 Women's Rugby League Conference: West London Sharks Ladies

2009

 Rugby League Conference National: Bramley Buffaloes
 Harry Jepson Trophy: West London Sharks
 RLC Regional: Northampton Casuals (now Northampton Demons)
 North West Premier: Lymm RL
 Yorkshire Premier: Kippax Knights
 Midlands Premier: Coventry Bears
 Southern Premier: West London Sharks
 Welsh Premier: Blackwood Bulldogs
 Welsh Plate: Newport Titans (now Titans RLFC)
 Scottish Division: Edinburgh Eagles
 North East Division: Jarrow Vikings
 North Midlands Division: Parkside Hawks
 East Division: Northampton Casuals (now Northampton Demons)
 London & South Division: Greenwich Admirals 
 South West Division: Devon Sharks
 Women's National Division: Bradford Thunderbirds
 Women's RLC Regional: Hillside Hawks
 Women's North West Division: Hillside Hawks  
 Women's Yorkshire Division: Keighley Cats

2010

 Rugby League Conference National: Warrington Wizards
 Harry Jepson Trophy: St Albans Centurions
 RLC Regional: Northampton Demons
 North West Premier: Widnes West Bank Bears
 Yorkshire Premier: East Leeds
 Midlands Premier: Coventry Bears
 Southern Premier: St Albans Centurions
 Welsh Premier: Valley Cougars
 Welsh Division: Neath Port Talbot Steelers 
 Scottish Division: Carluke Tigers
 North East Division: Jarrow Vikings
 North East Plate: Northallerton Stallions (now North Yorkshire Stallions)
 Yorkshire Division: Parkside Hawks
 North West Division: Mancunians RL
 Midlands Division: Leamington Royals
 East Division: Northampton Demons
 London & South Division: Greenwich Admirals 
 South West Division: East Devon Eagles
 Rugby League Conference Regional Championships: Midlands
 Women's RLC: Keighley Cats
 Women's RLC Plate: Coventry Bears

2011

 Rugby League Conference National: Huddersfield Underbank Rangers
 Harry Jepson Trophy: Parkside Hawks
 RLC Regional: Elmbridge Eagles
 North West Premier: Accrington and Leyland Lions
 North East Premier: Peterlee Pumas
 Yorkshire Premier: Parkside Hawks
 Midlands Premier: Bristol Sonics
 Southern Premier: Hammersmith Hills Hoists
 Scottish Premier: Edinburgh Eagles
 Welsh Premier: Bridgend Blue Bulls
 Welsh Championship: Bonymaen Broncos
 Scottish Division: Aberdeen Warriors
 North East Division: North Yorkshire Stallions 
 North West Division: Rochdale Cobras
 Midlands Division: Telford Raiders
 East Division: Sudbury Gladiators
 London & South Division: Elmbridge Eagles  
 South West Division: Somerset Vikings
 West of England: Gloucestershire Warriors
 Women's RLC: Warrington
 Women's RLC Plate: Leeds Akkies
 Women's RLC South Division: Coventry Bears
 Women's RLC North East Division: Hunslet Hawks
 Women's RLC Central Division: Bradford Thunderbirds
 Women's RLC North West Division: Leigh East
 Women's RLC West Division: Halton

See also

 History of the Rugby League Conference

External links
 Official website

Rugby League Conference